Alexandra Mary Louise "Alex" Danson,  (born 21 May 1985) is a retired English international hockey player who played as a forward for England and Great Britain. She played club hockey for Clifton Robinsons, Reading, Klein Zwitserland, Trojans and Alton.

Danson attended two independent schools, Yateley Manor Prep School and Farnborough Hill School, a Roman Catholic school for girls. Farnborough Hill School named their all-weather hockey pitch in her honour. She made her full international debut on 23 October 2001 against Germany. She won a gold medal at the 2016 Olympic Games and a bronze medal at the 2012 Olympic Games.

Danson was appointed Member of the Order of the British Empire (MBE) in the 2017 New Year Honours for services to hockey. Later that year Danson was announced as the England Women's Hockey Captain in June 2017 and led the team through to the last four in the semi-finals of the world league. Also in 2017, Danson launched the Alex Danson Hockey Academy, aimed at introducing young children to the sport through their schools to increase awareness and participation in hockey at a grassroots level.

She played her last international match on 2 August 2018, against the Netherlands.
It was her 306th appearance for England and Great Britain. Danson announced her retirement from playing hockey on 20 February 2020.

Honours and awards

Honours
Representing Great Britain
Olympic Games
2016 Rio de Janeiro: Gold
2012 London: Bronze

FIH Champions Trophy
2012 Rosario: Silver

Representing England
EuroHockey Nations Championship
2015 London: Gold
2013 Boom: Silver
2011 Monchengladbach: Bronze
2009 Amstelveen: Bronze
2007 Manchester: Bronze
2005 Dublin: Bronze

Commonwealth Games
2014 Glasgow: Silver
2010 Delhi: Bronze
2006 Melbourne: Bronze

World Cup
2010 Rosario: Bronze

FIH Champions Trophy
2010 Nottingham: Bronze

FIH Champions Challenge I
2007 Baku: Bronze
2002 Johannesburg: Gold

Country
London Cup Winner: 2012
London Cup Third-place: 2011

Reading Hockey Club
EuroHockey Club Champions Trophy Winners: 2013
EuroHockey Indoor Club Trophy Runners-up: 2014
Women's England Hockey League Winners: 2010–11, 2012–13; Runners-up: 2011–12
English Indoor Championship Winners: 2012–13, 2013–14; Runners-up: 2010–11, 2011–12
English League (regular season) Winners: 2011–12
English Indoor League (regular season) Third-place: 2013–14

Awards and nominations
2001 BBC Sports Personality of the Year Young Personality (runner-up)
2011 FIH World All Star Team
2011 Reading Sports Personality of Year
2011 UK Female Player of the Year (Hockey Writers' Club)
2011–12 Premier League Player of the Season
2011–12 Premier League Top Scorer
2011–12 Premier League All Star Team
2012 UK Female Player of the Year (Hockey Writers' Club) (runner-up)
2012 London Cup Player of the Tournament
2014–15 FIH Hockey World League Semi-finals Player of the Tournament
2015 EuroHockey Nations Championship Player of the Tournament
2015 Committee Award (Sports Journalists' Association)
2015 Sportswoman of the Year (Sports Journalists' Association) (4th place)
2015 UK Female Player of the Year (Hockey Writers' Club) (third-place)
2015 FIH Women's Player of the Year (International Hockey Federation) (nominated)

References

External links
 

 Alex Danson at GB Hockey (archived)
 
  (also see archived copy of former page)
 

1985 births
Living people
Commonwealth Games bronze medallists for England
English female field hockey players
Field hockey players at the 2006 Commonwealth Games
Field hockey players at the 2010 Commonwealth Games
Field hockey players at the 2008 Summer Olympics
Field hockey players at the 2012 Summer Olympics
Medalists at the 2012 Summer Olympics
Medalists at the 2016 Summer Olympics
Olympic gold medallists for Great Britain
Olympic bronze medallists for Great Britain
Olympic field hockey players of Great Britain
British female field hockey players
Olympic medalists in field hockey
Sportspeople from Southampton
Field hockey players at the 2014 Commonwealth Games
People educated at Farnborough Hill
Commonwealth Games silver medallists for England
Field hockey players at the 2016 Summer Olympics
Commonwealth Games medallists in field hockey
Members of the Order of the British Empire
Female field hockey forwards
HC Klein Zwitserland players
Reading Hockey Club players
Women's England Hockey League players
Medallists at the 2006 Commonwealth Games
Medallists at the 2010 Commonwealth Games
Medallists at the 2014 Commonwealth Games